Betty Stogs was a Cornishwoman in a folktale.  She lived on moorland near Towednack, Cornwall, England.  She had a six-month-old baby but was lazy and dissipated.  The neglected baby was cared for by the fairies, who returned it clean and laid upon a bed of moss.  The tale is a traditional one of the area; a warning to mothers to look after their children properly, lest the pixies take them.

A beer is now named Betty Stogs after this character.  With an ABV of 4.0% it is brewed by Skinner's Brewery in Truro and won the CAMRA prize for Champion Best Bitter in 2008.  The beer is the subject of songs:

"Farewell to your wines and whiskies
Your brandies and your grogs
I’d sail the world and back again
For a pint of Betty Stogs"

References

Cornish folklore
English beer brands